Colsay is an uninhabited island off the South West coast of Mainland, Shetland. Fora Ness lies to the south, across the Muckle Sound.

It is in Dunrossness parish, 8 miles (13 km) NNW of Sumburgh Head. It used to pasture a good many sheep mostly Cheviot/Shetland cross breeds, which were transported to the island by small boats, called Yoals, from the nearby Spiggie Beach, and landed at the only decent landing place on the island, called the "Owsin Gaet".

Uninhabited islands of Shetland